The 1939 Howard Bulldogs football team was an American football team that represented Howard College (now known as the Samford University) as a member of the Dixie Conference during the 1939 college football season. In their fifth year under head coach Billy Bancroft, the team compiled a 3–6–1 record.

Schedule

References

Howard
Samford Bulldogs football seasons
Howard Bulldogs football